Ellerton-on-Swale or Ellerton (historically known as Ellerton-upon-Swale) is a small village and civil parish about a mile east of Catterick in the Richmondshire district of North Yorkshire, England.  In 2015, North Yorkshire County Council estimated the population of the parish at 110.

The village sits just south of the B6271 road between Richmond and Northallerton, and has a large lake used for diving between the settlement and the River Swale to the south. Another lake to the west, Bolton-on-Swale Lake, is a former sand and gravel quarry and is now a Yorkshire Wildlife Trust sponsored nature reserve.

The village has an entry in the Domesday Book which states that it belonged to Count Alan and had six villagers. It is said that it is the birthplace of Henry Jenkins, who died in 1670 and is reported to have lived to an incredible age of 169 years. In 1743, a memorial obelisk was placed over his grave in the nearby churchyard of Bolton-on-Swale.

References

External links

Villages in North Yorkshire
Civil parishes in North Yorkshire